The Kenosha Mountains or Kenosha Mountain are a subrange (or long mountain) of the Front Range located in Park and Jefferson counties of Colorado.  Lying within the Pike National Forest, the range extends  from where it meets the Platte River Mountains to the northwest, to Windy Peak to the southeast.  This long mountain is bordered by the Platte River Mountains on the north and the Tarryall Mountains on the south.

References

Landforms of Park County, Colorado
Mountain ranges of Colorado
Landforms of Jefferson County, Colorado